Mitchell P. Kobelinski (August 1, 1928 – November 7, 1997) was an American attorney who served as a member of the Board of Directors of the Export–Import Bank of the United States from 1973 to 1976 and as Administrator of the Small Business Administration from 1976 to 1977. According Kobelinski, his top priority at the federal agency was to eliminate unnecessary red tape and paperwork for businessmen who are seeking loans. Meanwhile, he considered consumerism "a facade for socialism."

He died on November 7, 1997, in Chicago, Illinois at age 69.

References

1928 births
1997 deaths
Lawyers from Chicago
Administrators of the Small Business Administration
Illinois Republicans
20th-century American lawyers